The 2019 South Africa Women's Sevens was a tournament held at the Cape Town Stadium in Cape Town, South Africa from 13–15 December 2019. It will be the first edition of the South Africa Women's Sevens and will also be the third tournament of the 2019–20 World Rugby Women's Sevens Series.

Format
The teams are drawn into three pools of four teams each. Each team plays every other team in their pool once. The top two teams from each pool advance to the Cup/Plate brackets while the top 2 third place teams also compete in the Cup/Plate. The other teams from each group play-off for the Challenge Trophy.

Teams
Twelve teams will compete in the tournament with eleven being the core teams that compete throughout the entire season.

Pool stage

Pool A

Pool B

Pool C

Placement matches

Eleventh place

Ninth place

Knockout stage

Cup

Tournament placings

Source: World Rugby

See also
 World Rugby Women's Sevens Series
 2019–20 World Rugby Women's Sevens Series
 2019 South Africa Sevens

References

External links 
 World Rugby info

2019
2019–20 World Rugby Women's Sevens Series
2019 in women's rugby union
2019 in South African sport
2019 in African rugby union
South Africa Sevens
2019 in South African women's sport